Jürgen Paeke (born 13 September 1948, in Biesenthal) is a German gymnast who competed for the SC Dynamo Berlin / Sportvereinigung (SV) Dynamo.

References 

1948 births
Living people
People from Barnim
German male artistic gymnasts
Olympic gymnasts of East Germany
Gymnasts at the 1972 Summer Olympics
Olympic bronze medalists for East Germany
Olympic medalists in gymnastics
Medalists at the 1972 Summer Olympics
Sportspeople from Brandenburg
20th-century German people
21st-century German people